Egypt recognized newly independent Croatia on 16 April 1992 and the two countries established diplomatic relations on 1 October 1992.  Croatia has an embassy in Cairo and an honorary consulate in Alexandria. The Cairo Embassy also officially handles the countries of Bahrain, Ethiopia, Yemen, Jordan, Qatar, Kuwait, Lebanon, Oman, Saudi Arabia, Syria, Sudan and the UAE, as well as Djibouti, Eritrea and Iraq in certain matters. Egypt has an embassy in Zagreb. Both countries are members of the Union for the Mediterranean.

Approximately 2,700 workers from what is now Croatia worked on the construction of Suez Canal.
SFR Yugoslavia maintained good relations with Egypt, especially through the Non-Aligned Movement. In the 1970s and 1980s numerous Croatian companies had Egypt and other Arab countries as a capital export market, including INGRA, and the Croatian authorities have been trying to re-create these opportunities with various investment-related activities. Numerous Croatian officials made official visits to Egypt, and most recently Hosni Mubarak was in Zagreb in October 2009, while Jadranka Kosor returned the visit in December 2010. Croatian companies made some inroads in the Egyptian market, notably including an oil exploration concession for INA in 2002 that became significant in 2007. In early 2011, many Croatian workers were evacuated from Egypt, including those of INA, as the 2011 Egyptian revolution started.
In July 2011, the Croatian Government complied with the decision of the Council of the European Union to freeze Egyptian assets in connection to Mubarak and 18 connected persons.

In 2015, Croatian citizen Tomislav Salopek was abducted by  the ISIL-affiliated Sinai Province Islamist militant organization. Sinai Province published a still image purporting to show Salopek's decapitated body on 12 August 2015.

See also 
 Foreign relations of Croatia
 Foreign relations of Egypt
 Egypt–Yugoslavia relations
 Yugoslavia and the Non-Aligned Movement
 Yugoslavia and the Organisation of African Unity
 Egypt–European Union relations

References

External links 
  Croatian Ministry of Foreign Affairs and European Integration: list of bilateral treaties with Egypt

 
Egypt
Croatia